Anne-Marie Blanc (born 16 December 1931 Piennes, France) is a French writer and novelist. Her first novel, Marie-Romaine, won the Prix Erckmann-Chatrian in 1978.

Works 
1978: Marie-Romaine, novel, 1990 .
1991: Le Bassin de Landres : Baroncourt, Bouligny, Joudreville, Landres, Piennes, collective work under the direction of Anne-Marie Blanc, .
1991: Pays-Haut, .
2002: Pays-Haut, dits et récits 1939-1989, volume 2, La Parenthèse, .

References

External links 
 Anne-Marie Blanc on La Lorraine des écrivains

20th-century French non-fiction writers
21st-century French non-fiction writers
French women novelists
People from Meurthe-et-Moselle
1931 births
Living people
20th-century French women writers
21st-century French women writers